The 2014–15 season of the Belgian Pro League (known as the Jupiler Pro League for sponsorship reasons) is the 112th season of top-tier football in Belgium. It  started on  27 July 2014 and finished in May 2015. K.A.A. Gent won the league, making it the first championship title in their 115-year history.

Teams
Following the 2013–14 Belgian Pro League, R.A.E.C. Mons were relegated to the 2014–15 Belgian Second Division after losing their relegation playoff series against OH Leuven. Mons is replaced by 2013–14 Belgian Second Division champions K.V.C. Westerlo, who returned to the highest level after their relegation during the 2011–12 season.

Mouscron-Péruwelz replaces OH Leuven as they won the 2014 Belgian Second Division Final Round head of K.A.S. Eupen, Sint-TruidenV.V. and OH Leuven.

Stadia and locations

Personnel and kits

Managerial changes

Regular season

League table

Results

Championship playoff
The points obtained during the regular season were halved (and rounded up) before the start of the playoff. As a result, the teams started with the following points before the playoff: Club Brugge 31 points, Gent 29, Anderlecht 29, Standard 27, Kortrijk 26 and Charleroi 25. Had any ties occurred at the end of the playoffs, the half point would have been deducted if it was added. However, as all six teams received the half point bonus, this did not make a difference this season.

Playoff table

Europa League playoff
Group A contains the teams finishing the regular season in positions 7, 9, 12 and 14. The teams that finish in positions 8, 10, 11 and 13 were placed in Group B.

Group A

Group B

Europa League playoff final
The winners of both playoff groups, Mechelen and Lokeren, compete in a two-legged match to play the fourth-placed team of the championship playoff, called Testmatch. The winners of this Testmatch will be granted entry to the second qualifying round of the 2015–16 UEFA Europa League.

Mechelen won 4–3 on aggregate.

Testmatches Europa League
The Europa League playoff final was played over two legs between the Europa league playoff final winners, Mechelen, and the fifth-placed finisher of the championship playoff, Charleroi. The winners qualified for the second qualifying round of the 2015–16 UEFA Europa League.

Charleroi wins 3-2 on aggregate

Relegation playoff
The teams that finished in the last two positions will face each other in the relegation playoff. Lierse was sure of ending up in the relegation playoff after losing away to Gent on 7 March 2015, while Cercle Brugge qualified one week later after losing 2–3 at home to Mechelen.

The winner of this playoff will play the second division playoff with three Belgian Second Division teams, with only the winner of that playoff playing at the highest level the next season. Lierse failed to win the Belgian Second Division playoff resulting in their relegation, in addition to Cercle Brugge.

The matches in the table below were played from left to right:

Season statistics
Source: Sport.be Up to and including matches played on 24 May 2015.''

Top scorers

Hat-tricks

Notes

References

Belgian Pro League seasons
Belgian Pro League
1